KSMB (Kurt-Sunes med Berit) was a Swedish punk rock band from 1977 to 1982. The young band members grew up and lived in the suburb Skärholmen outside Stockholm.

History
Johan Johansson, Mats Nilsson and Pekka Kangas had a band called "Ingenting" (Swedish for "nothing"). Their first and only gig was at Österholmsskolan in Skärholmen.
In the autumn  of 1977 most of the band members went to Skärholmens Gymnasium and discovered that if one worked with a project, like a band, one would not have to go to all the lessons. "Skärholmens Gymnasiums Punkensemble" was started and, as a lot of people did not want to go to the lessons, the band got a lot of members. After a chaotic gig in the aula in Skärholmens Gymnasium with 15 band members, of which 5 were singers, the project "Skärholmens Gymnasiums Punkensemble" was over, but the singers Steppan and Alonzo, drummer Johan Johansson and bassist Matte Nilsson continued and became the only constant members of "KSMB," as the new band was called. This abbreviation stood for "Kurt-Sunes med Berit".

Band members

Discography

1979 - Bakverk 80 (Page on Swedish Wikipedia)
1980 - Aktion (Page on Swedish Wikipedia)
1981 - Rika Barn Leka Bäst (Page on Swedish Wikipedia)
1983 - Dé é För Mycké (Live) (Page on Swedish Wikipedia)
1989 - Sardjentpepper (Page on Swedish Wikipedia)
1993 - En gång till
2017 - Ond saga

References

External links
 - pictures from concert in 1981. (in Swedish)

Swedish punk rock groups